Ethylsarin (GE), also known as EA-1209, TL-1620 or T-2109, is an organophosphate nerve agent of the G-series. It is the ethylphosphonofluoridate analog of sarin.

References

G-series nerve agents
Acetylcholinesterase inhibitors
Isopropyl esters
Ethylphosphonofluoridates